Lipovo is a village in northern Montenegro, in Kolašin Municipality. It has a population of about 250 people.

Lipovo is well known in Montenegro for its cold-water springs, green forests and rivers which are full of fish.

History 
During World War II, Lipovo was an important place for The Yugoslav Army in the Fatherland, and for their leader Draža Mihailović, as he used to hide in this Montenegrin village.

References 

Populated places in Kolašin Municipality